The 1877 New York state election was held on November 6, 1877, to elect the Secretary of State, the State Comptroller, the Attorney General, the State Treasurer and the State Engineer, as well as all members of the New York State Assembly and the New York State Senate.

History
The Republican state convention met on September 26 and 27 at Rochester, New York. John C. Churchill for Secretary of State, Francis Sylvester for Comptroller, William L. Bostwick for Treasurer, Grenville Tremain for Attorney General, and Howard Soule, Jr., for State Engineer, were nominated unanimously without much debate. Sylvester declined to run, and on October 19, the State Committee substituted Clinton V. R. Ludington for Comptroller on the ticket.

The Working Men's state convention met at Troy, New York, and nominated John J. Junio, of Auburn, for Secretary of State; George Blair for Comptroller; Warren T. Worden for Attorney General; Samuel G. Rice for Treasurer; and Walter T. Griswold for State Engineer.

The Democratic state convention met on October 3 and 4 at Albany, New York. Clarkson N. Potter was President. Allen C. Beach was nominated for Secretary of State on the first ballot (vote: Beach 227, John Bigelow [incumbent] 144, A. B. Weaver 12). The incumbent Comptroller Frederic P. Olcott was re-nominated by acclamation. James Mackin for Treasurer and Augustus Schoonmaker, Jr., for Attorney General, And Horatio Seymour, Jr., for State Engineer were nominated after some haggling and without much voting. Summing up, John Kelly had managed to wrest the power in the Democratic Party from the Tilden-Robinson faction.

The Bread-Winners League's state convention met on October 10 at Albany, New York. Charles H. Truax was President. The convention nominated John J. Junio for Secretary of State, Frederic P. Olcott (Dem.) for Comptroller, Elmore Sharpe for Attorney General, Julius Kern for Treasurer and Horatio Seymour, Jr. (Dem.), for State Engineer.

The German-American Independent Citizens' Committee met on October 12 at Beethoven Hall in New York City. Oswald Ottendorfer presided. The Committee cross-endorsed the following state ticket: Churchill (Rep.) for Secretary of State, Olcott (Dem.) for Comptroller, Bostwick (Rep.) for Treasurer, Tremain (Rep.) for Attorney General and Seymour (Dem.) for State Engineer.

Results
The entire state-wide Democratic ticket was elected.

The incumbent Olcott was re-elected.

The numbers are the total votes on all tickets.

Notes

Sources
 The Tickets: For State Officers New York Times. October 29, 1877 (has Michael F. McKiernan, William S Jaynes, and Rushton Smith on Workingmen's ticket)
 The Vote of Albany New York Times. November 12, 1877
 Results in The Evening Journal Almanac (1878, p. 62)
 Results: The Tribune Almanac 1878

See also
New York state elections

1877
1877 New York (state) elections